Birhana Road is an important commercial street in Kanpur, India. Birhana Road is the nerve centre of the retail jewellery trade, and has the largest concentration of jewellers in Kanpur.

References

Neighbourhoods in Kanpur
Shopping districts and streets in India